Collins Peak is a small but noteworthy peak,  high, at the east side of Malta Plateau, on the end of the ridge overlooking the confluence of Hand Glacier and Line Glacier, in the Victory Mountains, Victoria Land. It was mapped by the United States Geological Survey from surveys and from U.S. Navy air photos, 1960–64, and named by the Advisory Committee on Antarctic Names for Eric J. Collins, biologist at Hallett Station, 1965–66.

References
 

Mountains of Victoria Land
Borchgrevink Coast